Marie-Madeleine Agnès de Gontaut Biron (1653–1720) was a French aristocrat.

She was the unofficial lover of king Louis XIV of France in 1680–1683.

References

 K. F. Oelke, Louis XIV and the Land of Love and Adventure: 1679 to 1699

1653 births
1720 deaths
Mistresses of Louis XIV